Kalateh-ye Ghamu (also Romanized as Kalāteh-ye Ghamū and Kalāteh-ye Qamū; also known as Kalāteh-ye Ghanbar and Kalāteh Chanbar) is a village in Ghazi Rural District, Samalqan District, Maneh and Samalqan County, North Khorasan Province, Iran. At the 2006 census, its population was 610, in 155 families.

References 

Populated places in Maneh and Samalqan County